Crack Fighter is an 2019 Indian Bhojpuri-language action romantic drama film directed by Sujit Kumar Singh and produced by Upendra Singh. It stars Pawan Singh, Sanchita Banerjee and Nidhi Jha in lead roles. Pradeep Rawat, Brijesh Tripathi, Umesh Singh, Lota Tiwari, Dhama Verma play supporting roles.

Cast
Pawan Singh
Sanchita Banerjee
Nidhi Jha
Pradeep Rawat
Chandani Singh
Brijesh Tripathi
Lota Tiwari
Dhama Verma
Umesh Singh

Production
The film is directed by Sujit Kumar Singh and produced by Upendra Singh. It is co-produced by Lokesh Mishra. The cinematography has been done by Venkat Mahesh, while the choreography is by Kanu Mukerjee and Sanjay Korbe. The story and dialogue were written by Veeru Thakur, it was edited by Deepak Jaul, and its action director is L Malesh. It was released in mid 2019.

Music
The film's music is composed by Chhote Baba with lyrics written by Sumit Singh Chandravanshi, Vinay Nirmal, R R Pankaj and Jahid Akhtar. It is produced under the Wave Music company.

Marketing
A first-look poster was released on 6 March 2019 at the official Instagram sub-handle of Pawan Singh. The trailer of this film was released on 17 March 2019 at the official YouTube channel of "Wave Music". The film was released on 21 March 2019 in theatres.

References

Indian romantic action films
2019 films
2010s Bhojpuri-language films